Sakine Cansız (1958 – 9 January 2013) was one of the co-founders of the Kurdistan Workers' Party (PKK). A Kurdish activist in the 1980s, she was arrested and tortured by Turkish police. A close associate of Abdullah Öcalan and a senior member of the PKK, she was shot dead during the triple murder of Kurdish activists in Paris, France, on 9 January 2013, along with two other female Kurdish activists, Fidan Doğan and Leyla Söylemez.

Early life
Cansız was born around 1958 in Tunceli, to an Alevi Kurdish family. She had  seven siblings and she was the eldest daughter. She went to primary and secondary school in Tunceli. In secondary school, she was influenced by her teacher Yusuf Kenan Deniz, who introduced his class to the Dev-Genç, the Revolutionary Youth Federation of Turkey. She began to hear about Denis Gezmis on the radio and saw posters of him depicted as a hero. There were also other posters that called him names like "terrorist" and "communist on the run". Sakine and her friends took down the posters, which they thought showed negative depictions, in hopes that none of the people would be found. It was in middle school, that she experienced  dissent for the first time, and learned to be secretive about certain topics. In 1969, her father migrated to Germany.

In 1973, she and her elder brother followed their father to Berlin, Germany. After 11 months in Berlin she returned to Dersim, where she began to study at the Gymnasium and became engaged to Metin. She began to take part in revolutionary activities, which were not endorsed by the family of her fiancée. She fled to Ankara where she first met Abdullah Öcalan, with whom she would work closely. In an interview, she said of this period: "In a sense I abandoned the family. I did not accept that pressure, insisting on revolutionism. That's how I left and went to Ankara. In secret of course."

Revolutionary consciousness 

 While in Germany, Sakine attended an event with her father where attendees were dressed in traditional Kurdish attire. Sakine did not wear traditional clothing and was upset when she realized that everyone else attending the event was wearing traditional clothing. Upon moving back to Dersim her relationship with her mother became rocky as she was growing up, while also gaining a revolutionary consciousness and she felt her mother was attempting to control her life. Sakine acknowledged that her mother's attempt to control her only made her want to rebel more.
 A protest took place at Sakine's school, fighting for improved school conditions. The demonstration was considered an act of resistance and Sakine felt as though she had to participate. The police threw stones at them to try and put a stop to the protests and many students were arrested. Violence began to break out, in front of a government building where the students had gathered. This was Sakine's first experience in an uprising situation. Many of her friends were arrested and detained.
 After the protest, school for Sakine began to feel mundane and trivial. For Sakine, the possibility of raising political developments and awareness in the classroom was more important than traditional coursework. School became a political gathering place rather than a place for education and Sakine began to experience a total shift in her identity as a young woman. Her desires and behaviors changed greatly and she began to surround herself with politically motivated people like herself. She also began to experience difficulties in her relationship with her fiancé, Metin, she spent less and less time thinking about him and became frustrated when he tried to give her advice on how to live her life.
 Sakine began her own group that began to gain consciousness and grew stronger- the first revolutionary women's group. The women worked together to point out each other's weaknesses and identify mistakes in an attempt to make their group consciousness stronger. The group had no name, no headquarters, no newspaper but everyone agreed to act the same way in the face of injustice. Eventually the name "Apocu" emerged. The  number of group members was increasing along with the consciousness of Kurdish identity and tradition.

Sakine's escape to become a revolutionary 

 Sakine still felt tied to her family, but she knew if she had stayed with them it would be impossible for her to be a revolutionary. She finally made the decision to escape in May 1975. She obtained her ID from her school by telling them that she was going to get married. She arrived at her extended family's home and they were happy to see her but they explained that they have to tell Sakine's parents that she is safe with them. This infuriated her and she decided to leave to meet up with political science faculty who were going to think more similarly to her. She moved to Izmir with Baki and worked in a factory alongside other workers who were mostly Kurds. Sakine and Baki decided to get married despite her previous rejection to his proposals.
 Sakine acknowledged in discussions with her Turkish friends she could tolerate some of their arguments surrounding the topic of Kurdistan, but when she is with her Kurdish friends she was unable to tolerate it. She admitted that these discussions often became very confrontational, however she was educated on these topics and was not going to let others tell her she was wrong. She felt as though the Marxist classics best demonstrated the group's political outlook, it was not necessary that the name Kurdistan be used. The groups' ideological ideas were analyzed, discussed and created prior to the October revolution.
 Sakine began to find people that are similar to her and she started to feel more welcomed. She went to different political clubs where she was able to make friends that have similar ideologies as her. She was considered part of the UKO- the Kurdistan revolutionary group. Sakine decided to take a break from her relationship with Baki to focus on herself. Baki did not align with Sakine organizationally or ideologically and it was beginning to take a toll on their relationship, she admitted to herself and her older brother that she is unhappy.
 A big demonstration took place against the state security courts, all of the different groups were going to participate. Sakine admitted that she learned a lot from these events that took place in Izmir, she began to feel more comfortable defending her position even though she was far away from her home country and her organization. In the factory where she worked, Sakine explained to her peers that as a Kurdistan Revolutionary she felt as though it was her role to contribute to the workers' resistance. Her goal was not to organize the workers and make them participate in the Kurdistan Revolution, but rather to try and help them to see their problems in comparison to the working class. By doing this, she would attempt to bring awareness to what the Kurdish people are going through and allow a consciousness of solidarity to emerge. Sakine brought up the idea of failing to perform a task because they expected someone else to do it which would insinuate that they approve of the other person's oversights, however she pointed out that someone with a revolutionary consciousness would not behave this way. Instead, they did what others neglect, even if it meant she will not be taken seriously it was better to be involved in the conversation and stand up for what she believed in than to stand on the sidelines and not participate.

Activities
She was one of the PKK's founding members (code name "Sara"), and the organization's first senior female member. At the founding meeting of the PKK in Lice in southern Turkey in late September or November 1978 (with 22 persons attending), she represented Elâzığ, the administrative center of Elâzığ Province. Cansız and Öcalan's former wife Kesire Yıldırım were the only women who participated in this meeting. Cansız was arrested in 1979 soon after graduating high school. According to The Guardian, she was arrested just after the 1980 Turkish coup d'état. Cansiz was imprisoned along with other members of the PKK. She spent years in jail in Diyarbakir where 34 inmates died of torture between the years 1981 and 1989. The treatment that they received in the prison was horrible and was one of the main reasons for the organizations radicalization and the increased armed struggle against the Turkish that began in 1984. While in jail, Cansiz continued her work for the Kurdish movement, becoming a "legend among PKK members".

After her release in 1991, Cansız stayed in the PKK camps in Lebanon's Beqaa Valley and then in northern Iraq where she fought under the command of Osman Ocalan. In addition to fighting she organized and headed women squads of the PKK there. She went to Europe in the mid-1990s. Murat Karayılan sent her there to be responsible for the PKK's European branch, first in Germany and then in France, to deal with the group's civil affairs. According to Hürriyet, she was moved to Europe after having opposed the execution of PKK member Mehmet Şener. France granted Cansız asylum in 1998 after she had disagreed with some senior PKK figures. She was detained in Hamburg in March 2007 upon Turkeys request, but released after protests opposing her detention in April 2007.

Reportedly, "she was the most prominent and most important female Kurdish activist. She did not shy away from speaking her mind, especially when it came to women's issues."

Death

On 10 January 2013, Cansız, in her 50s, was found dead with two other Kurdish female activists, Fidan Doğan and Leyla Şaylemez. Autopsy results placed the time of death for the three women as sometime between 6pm and 7pm on the day before. Their bodies were found in the Kurdistan Information Center in Paris.

The three women were last seen inside an information center on a Wednesday afternoon, hours later a member of the Kurdish community tried to visit the center but the door was locked. The three women were found dead with gunshot wounds in the information center on Thursday morning. That was the first time that a senior member of the PKK had been killed in Europe.  

The killings occurred at a time when the Turkish government was in negotiation with PKK leaders including Öcalan. PKK activists in Paris considered the murders an attempt by "dark forces" within the Turkish government to derail these negotiations. The PKK blamed the Turkish government. Turkish officials pointed at frequent strife within the PKK, with the Turkish national daily Hürriyet claiming that Cansız had been in conflict with Bahoz Erdal, the alleged commander of the PKK's military wing. Also killed were Fidan Doğan of the Kurdistan National Congress (based in Brussels) and Leyla Söylemez, a "junior activist". The French interior minister Manuel Valls announced that the three women were all killed execution-style. Two days after the murder, Ömer Güney was detained and later prosecuted for the assassination of the three women. The prosecutor François Molins concluded that the surveillance cameras showed that Ömer Güney was within the Kurdish Information Center during the time of the assassination. And on his bag was found gunpowder.

On 17 December 2016, Ömer Güney, the sole suspect in the assassination of Sakine Cansız, Fidan Doğan and Leyla Şaylemez died of a severe illness in his Paris prison cell. After his death the French authority decided to close the investigation into the assassination of the three women. In May 2019 the investigation was reopened.

Funeral
The body of Cansız together with those of the other two women murdered was brought from Paris to Istanbul on 16 January 2013 and transferred to Diyarbakır. A funeral ceremony for the three slain women was held in Diyarbakır with the attendance of tens of thousands of Kurds on 17 January 2013. Each was buried in her hometown: Cansız in Tunceli, Doğan in Kahramanmaraş, and Söylemez in Mersin.

Reactions
Both Turkey and France condemned the killings of the three women. Turkish Prime Minister Recep Tayyip Erdoğan suggested that the murders were done for two possible reasons: 1) to derail the current negotiations or 2) to carry out an internal execution within the PKK. Turkey's Deputy Prime Minister and government spokesman Bülent Arınç condemned the attack and expressed his condolences.

See also

List of unsolved murders

References

1958 births
2013 deaths
Assassinated activists
Assassinated Kurdish people
Apoists
Date of birth unknown
Deaths by firearm in France
Female murder victims
Kurdish activists
Kurdish Alevis
Kurdish human rights activists
Kurdish women activists
Kurdish women's rights activists
Members of the Kurdistan Workers' Party
People from Tunceli
People murdered in France
Prisoners and detainees of Turkey
Turkish people murdered abroad
Turkish exiles
Turkish torture victims
2013 murders in Europe
Unsolved murders in France
2013 murders in France